Dopamine beta (β)-hydroxylase deficiency is a condition involving inadequate dopamine beta-hydroxylase. It is characterized by increased amounts of serum dopamine and the absence of norepinephrine (NE) and epinephrine. Dopamine is released, as a false neurotransmitter, in place of norepinephrine. Other names for norepinephrine include noradrenaline (NA) and noradrenalin. This condition is also sometimes referred to as "norepinephrine deficiency". Researchers of disorders such as schizophrenia are interested in studying this disorder, as patients with these specific diseases can have an increase in the amount of dopamine in their system and yet do not show other symptoms of DβH deficiency.

Dopamine beta-hydroxylase deficiency is a very rare form of dysautonomia. It belongs to the class of rare diseases, with "a prevalence of fewer than 20 affected individuals, all of Western European descent", as described in the scientific literature. It is an autosomal recessive disorder caused by a mutation in the DβH gene, which results in the production of a nonfunctional dopamine β-hydroxylase enzyme. Without this enzyme, the patients with DβH deficiency develop many clinical manifestations which greatly affect their daily lives.

Signs and symptoms 
Dopamine beta (β)-hydroxylase deficiency is a condition that affects the autonomic nervous system (ANS). The ANS works via two opposing branches, the sympathetic and parasympathetic, both of which antagonistically control involuntary processes that regulate bodily homeostasis. Problems related to DβH deficiency often first appear as complications shortly after birth. Postnatal episodes may include vomiting, dehydration, hypotension, muscle hypotonia, hypothermia, and hypoglycemia.

Due to the deficiency of norepinephrine and epinephrine those affected by dopamine β-hydroxylase deficiency may present with droopy eyelids (ptosis), nasal congestion, and hypotension. The most common complaint of individuals with dopamine β-hydroxylase deficiency is orthostatic hypotension. The symptoms associated with orthostatic hypotension are dizziness, blurred vision, or fainting upon standing. Therefore, DβH deficiency patients may have an inability to stand for a prolonged period of time. This phenomenon is especially pronounced when going from supine to upright positions, such as getting out of bed in the morning. It is also worsened by extreme climates due to loss of fluid through excessive sweating. The inability to maintain normal blood pressure makes it difficult for people with DβH deficiency to exercise (exercise intolerance). Males with DβH deficiency may experience retrograde ejaculation, a discharge of semen backward into the bladder due to dysmotility of their smooth muscle, which as innervated by the ANS. A subset of DβH deficiency patients present with hypermobility. Postural orthostatic tachycardia syndrome, another form of dysautonomia, also sees this comorbidity with hypermobility in the form of a rare connective tissue disorder called Ehlers Danlos syndrome.

Another commonly experienced symptom is hypoglycemia, which is thought to be caused by adrenomedullary failure. In looking at the cardiovascular system, a loss of noradrenergic control is seen as T-wave abnormalities on electrocardiogram. Prolactin is frequently suppressed by excessive dopamine found in the patient's central nervous system. Excess dopamine can also affect digestion, producing vomiting and inhibiting motor signaling to the GI tract.

Diagnosis

Treatment

Lifestyle 
Untreated individuals with DβH deficiency should avoid hot environments, strenuous exercise, standing still for prolonged time and dehydration. Care should be taken when changing position from horizontal to upright.

Medications 
Since the conversion of dihydroxyphenylserine (Droxidopa; trade name: Northera; also known as L-DOPS, L-threo-dihydroxyphenylserine, L-threo-DOPS and SM-5688), to norepinephrine bypasses the dopamine beta-hydroxylation step of catecholamine synthesis, L-Threo-DOPS is the ideal therapeutic agent. In humans with DβH deficiency, L-Threo-DOPS, a synthetic precursor of noradrenaline,  administration has proven effective in dramatic increase of blood pressure and subsequent relief of postural symptoms.

L-DOPS continues to be studied pharmacologically and pharmacokinetically and shows an ability to increase the levels of central nervous system norepinephrine by a significant amount. This is despite the fact that L-DOPS has a relative difficulty crossing the blood-brain barrier when compared to other medications such as L-DOPA. When used concurrently, there is evidence to show that there is increased efficacy as they are both intimately involved and connected to the pathway in becoming norepinephrine.

There is hope and evidence that L-DOPS can be used much more widely to help other conditions or symptoms such as pain, chronic stroke symptoms, and progressive supranuclear palsy, amongst others. Clinically, L-DOPS has been already shown to be helpful in treating a variety of other conditions related to hypotension including the following:
 Diabetes induced orthostatic hypotension
 Dialysis-induced hypotension
 Orthostatic intolerance
 Familial amyloidotic polyneuropathy
 Spinal Cord Injury related hypotension
Empirical evidence of mild effectiveness has been reported using mineralocorticoids or adrenergic receptor agonists as therapies.

Other medications that can bring relief to symptoms include:
 phenylpropanolamine- due to pressor response to vascular α-adrenoceptors
 indomethacin
Vitamin C (ascorbic acid) is also a required cofactor for the Dopamine beta hydroxylase enzyme. Recent research has shown that vitamin C rapidly catalyzes the conversion of dopamine to norepinephrine through stimulation of the dopamine beta hydroxylase enzyme.

Prognosis 
This is a form of dysautonomia but differentiated from familial dysautonomia by a lack of familial dysautonomic symptoms such as loss of sense of pain and smell. While L-threo-DOPS has been described as being "very effective for restoring noradrenergic tone and correcting postural hypotension, response to treatment is variable and the long-term and functional outcome is unknown."

Researchers have put together retrospective data collections in order to better under the progression of this orphan disease. Most studies show a perinatal period marked by inadequacy of the ANS to control blood pressure, blood sugar, and body temperature. The experiences of orthostatic hypotension, exercise intolerance, and "traumatic morbidity related to falls and syncope" have been documented later in lives of people with this condition. To provide a basis for improving the understanding of the epidemiology, genotype/phenotype correlation, outcome of these diseases, their impact on the quality of life of patients, and for evaluating diagnostic and therapeutic strategies, a patient registry was established by the non-commercial International Working Group on Neurotransmitter Related Disorders (iNTD).

Current research 
Recent studies have explored the connection between DβH deficiency, Droxidopa treatment, and the effect on orthostatic tolerance and glucose homeostasis. It was found that Droxidopa increased acute and late glucose-stimulated insulin secretion and improved patients' insulin sensitivity. However, the use of Droxidopa was found to only produce "modest changes in glucose homeostasis" overall. This shows that treatment modalities other than Droxidopa should be pursued as possible adjuncts for the hyperinsulinemia seen in DβH deficiency.

References

Further reading
  GeneReviews/NCBI/NIH/UW entry on Dopamine Beta-Hydroxylase Deficiency

External links 

Amino acid metabolism disorders
Autosomal recessive disorders